Rita Karen Olsen Beck (born January 31, 1933 Copenhagen, Denmark) is a Danish American-Costa Rican diplomat, politician and social worker. She has served as the First Lady of Costa Rica during the governments of her husband Jose Figueres Ferrer 1954-1958 and 1970–1974, a Legislative Assemblywoman and the Ambassador of Costa Rica to Israel.

Biography 
Olsen was born Rita Karen Olsen in Copenhagen, Denmark. Her parents, Walter Olsen and Karen Beck Olsen, had emigrated to the United States from Denmark and became naturalized U.S. citizens. She lived in Yorktown Heights, New York.

From an early age she exhibited great interest in social issues.  While a student at Mary Washington College (now University of Mary Washington) she was involved in several movements promoting solidarity with, and defense of, the needy. After graduating from Mary Washington College, Olsen enrolled at the University of Copenhagen to study social sciences. She then received a Master of Arts in sociology from Columbia University in New York City.

She married the then-President of Costa Rica, José Figueres Ferrer, on February 7, 1954, becoming the country's First Lady. Olsen was 23 years old at the time of the wedding, while Figueres was 47. The ceremony was performed at the home of Figueres' brother, Antonio Figueres, by Archbishop Ruben Odio Herrera. President Figueres had divorced his first wife, former First Lady Henrietta Boggs, on January 1, 1954.

With Figueres she had four children, including José María, also president of Costa Rica 1994–1998; and Christiana Figueres, a specialist in environment and climate change, who is the executive secretary of the United Nations Framework Convention on Climate Change.

References

Living people
1933 births
Members of the Legislative Assembly of Costa Rica
Ambassadors of Costa Rica to Israel
First ladies and gentlemen of Costa Rica
National Liberation Party (Costa Rica) politicians
20th-century Costa Rican women politicians
20th-century Costa Rican politicians
American social workers
Columbia Graduate School of Arts and Sciences alumni
University of Copenhagen alumni
University of Mary Washington alumni
American emigrants to Costa Rica
American people of Danish descent
Costa Rican people of Danish descent
People from Yorktown Heights, New York
Costa Rican women ambassadors
Naturalized citizens of the United States